Lobelia is a genus of flowering plants.

Lobelia may also refer to:

 Lobelia, West Virginia
 Lobelia, a Belgian naval vessel
 1066 Lobelia, a minor planet
 Lobelia Sackville-Baggins, a character in J. R. R. Tolkien's The Lord of the Rings
 Lobelia, a character in Dead or Alive Xtreme Venus Vacation.